The Golden Plague (German: Die goldene Pest) is a 1921 German silent thriller film directed by Louis Ralph and Richard Oswald and starring Louis Ralph, Anita Berber and Paul Bildt. An anarchist attempts to use a formula for artificial gold as part of a plan to flood the world market, causing an international crisis.

The film's sets were designed by the art director Botho Hoefer and István Szirontai Lhotka.

Cast
 Louis Ralph as Jacques Delma 
 Anita Berber as Natascha 
 Paul Bildt as John Marker (chemistry student) 
 Hans Adalbert Schlettow as Dr. Jonas Fjeld 
 Emil Wittig as Brocke 
 Felix Norfolk as Bradley 
 Arthur Bergen as Bokine 
 Hans Wallner as Croft 
 Rudolf Klein-Rhoden as Faber 
 Michael Rainer-Steiner as Lord Cavendish (president, Bank of England) 
 Karl Martell as Patrick Murphy (Cavendish's secretary) 
 Fred Berger as Det. James Clifford 
 Emil Stammer as Det. Hansen 
 Hermann Picha as Det. Ohlsen
 Curt Cappi as Det. Binet

References

Bibliography
 Barbara Hales, Mihaela Petrescu and Valerie Weinstein. Continuity and Crisis in German Cinema, 1928-1936. Boydell & Brewer, 2016.

External links

1921 films
Films of the Weimar Republic
Films directed by Richard Oswald
Films directed by Louis Ralph
German silent feature films
1920s thriller films
German thriller films
Films based on Norwegian novels
National Film films
Silent thriller films
1920s German films
1920s German-language films